Nufar Edelman (born August 19, 1982) is an Israeli Olympic sailor. She competes in the Laser Radial, a class of small singlehanded sailing dinghy.

Biography
Edelman is Jewish and was born in Rosh HaNikra, Israel. She finished 4th in the 2004 Laser Radial World Championships.

Edelman finished 7th out of 97 competitors in the 2007 Laser Radial World Championships in Cascais, Portugal, becoming the first Israeli woman to meet the criteria for the Olympics in the Laser Radial.

She competed on behalf of Israel at the 2008 Summer Olympics in Beijing, China, in the Women's Laser Radial One-Person Dinghy, and came in 16th. At the 2012 Summer Olympics she competed in the same class finishing in 30th place.

References

External links
 

1982 births
Living people
Israeli sailors (sport)
Sailors at the 2008 Summer Olympics – Laser Radial
Sailors at the 2012 Summer Olympics – Laser Radial
Olympic sailors of Israel
Israeli female sailors (sport)
Jewish sailors (sport)
Israeli Jews
People from Rosh HaNikra